The Canton of Aigrefeuille-d'Aunis is a former canton of the Charente-Maritime department, in France. It was disbanded following the French canton reorganisation which came into effect in March 2015. It had 14,310 inhabitants (2012). The lowest point was in the commune of Ardillières, the highest point was Le Thou at 48 m, the average elevation was 16 m.

Communes
The canton comprised the following communes:

Aigrefeuille-d'Aunis
Ardillières
Ballon
Bouhet
Chambon
Ciré-d'Aunis
Forges
Landrais
Thairé
Le Thou
Virson

Population history

See also 
 Cantons of the Charente-Maritime department

References

Aigrefeuille-d'Aunis
2015 disestablishments in France
States and territories disestablished in 2015